The Holocaust in Russia is the Nazi crimes during the occupation of Russia (Russian Soviet Federative Socialist Republic) by Nazi Germany.

On the Eve of the Holocaust 
The Soviet Union did grant official "equality of all citizens regardless of status, sex, race, religion, and nationality." The years before the Holocaust were an era of rapid change for Soviet Jews, leaving behind the dreadful poverty of the Pale of Settlement. 40% of the population in the former Pale left for large cities within the Soviet Union. Emphasis on education and movement from countryside shtetls to newly industrialized cities allowed many Soviet Jews to enjoy overall advances under Joseph Stalin and to become one of the most educated population groups in the world. Due to Stalinist emphasis on its urban population, interwar migration inadvertently rescued countless Soviet Jews—Nazi Germany penetrated the entire former Jewish Pale, but were kilometers short of Leningrad and Moscow.

World War II 

On 22 June 1941, Adolf Hitler abruptly broke the non−aggression pact and invaded the Soviet Union. The Soviet territories occupied by early 1942, including all of Belarus, Estonia, Latvia, Lithuania, Moldova, Ukraine and most Russian territory west of the line Leningrad–Moscow–Rostov, contained about four million Jews, including hundreds of thousands who had fled Poland in 1939. Despite the chaos of the Soviet retreat, some effort was made to evacuate Jews, who were either employed in the military industries or were family members of servicemen. Of 4 million about a million succeeded in escaping further east. The "Holocaust by bullet" was the task of SS death squads called Einsatzgruppen, under the overall command of Reinhard Heydrich. These had been used on a limited scale in Poland in 1939, but were now organized on a much larger scale. Most of their victims were defenseless Jewish civilians (not a single Einsatzgruppe member was killed in action during these operations). They used their skills to become efficient killers, according to Michael Berenbaum. By the end of 1941, however, the Einsatzgruppen had killed only 15 percent of the Jews in the occupied Soviet territories, and it was apparent that these methods could not be used to kill all the Jews of Europe. Even before the invasion of the Soviet Union, experiments with killing Jews in the back of vans using gas from the van's exhaust had been carried out, and when this proved too slow, more lethal gasses were tried. Units of the Wehrmacht also participated in many aspects of the Holocaust in Russia.

The Holocaust in the RSFSR 
The Black Book of Soviet Jewry contains a section on occupied Russia, with testimonies about the Holocaust in Smolensk, Rostov-on-Don, Yessentuki, Kislovodsk and Stavropol among others. 

It is estimated by some that before the war, 130,000 Jews lived in parts of the RSFRS that would be later be occupied. The majority evacuated eastward, and a report written by Einsatzgruppen mentions the massive flight. Most of the Jews who remained in occupied RSFSR territories with the advance of the Wehrmacht were murdered by the beginning of 1942, except for some in the southern areas who were murdered between spring 1942 and winter 1942-1943.

The YIVO encyclopedia places the number of Holocaust victims in the Russian Soviet Federated Socialist Republic at over 119,000. This is because while much of the local Jewish population escaped, many refugees from places further west fled to these areas, only for them to be captured later. According to this source, most Holocaust victims in the RSFSR were murdered in the areas of Rostov-on-Don, Krasnodar, Smolensk and Bryansk.

Aftermath 
The Nazi Genocide of the Jews carried by German Einsatzgruppen, and Wehrmacht along with local collaborators resulted in almost complete annihilation of the Jewish population over the entire territory temporarily occupied by Germany and its allies. During World War II, Léon Poliakov established the Center of Contemporary Jewish Documentation (1943) and after the war, he assisted Edgar Faure at the Nuremberg Trial.

In July 1943, a Soviet military court in Krasnodar held the first war crimes trial of World War II. There were 11 defendants, all of whom were collaborators. They were each charged with treason for helping the Germans murder 7000 people during the occupation of Krasnodar. All but one of the defendants were members of the death squad Sonderkommando 10a, a subunit of Einsatzgruppe D.

All of the defendants pleaded guilty and begged for leniency. Eight of them were sentenced to death and publicly hanged on 18 July 1943, the day after sentencing. The other three were deemed to have had relatively minor roles and were instead each sentenced to 20 years of hard labour. While outside observers viewed the proceedings as a show trial, they did not doubt the severity or the extent of the crimes themselves, nor the guilt of the defendants. Observers said the true purpose of the trial was to showcase the suffering of Soviet civilians and deter further collaboration.

Massacres 
 Gully of Petrushino, near Taganrog, October 1941

After World War II 

Following the war, the Soviet Union suppressed or downplayed the impact of Nazi crimes on its Jewish citizens. An anti-Semitic campaign against "rootless cosmopolitans" (i.e. "Zionists") followed. On 12 August 1952, in the event known as the Night of the Murdered Poets, thirteen most prominent Yiddish writers, poets, actors and other intellectuals were executed on the orders of Joseph Stalin, among them Peretz Markish, Leib Kvitko, David Hofstein, Itzik Feffer and David Bergelson.

Research 
The United States Holocaust Memorial Museum's Mandel Center's Initiative on the Holocaust in the Soviet Union works to gain a better understanding of this developing subfield and unearth the crimes and casualties. The Mandel Center partnered with various international organizations such as the International Centre for History and Sociology of World War II and its Consequences at the National Research University Higher School of Economics, The Yiddish Language Institute, the Center for Judaic Studies at the University of Latvia, the Museum “Jews in Latvia", Taras Shevchenko National University of Kyiv, the Ukrainian Center for Holocaust Studies, and the National University of Kyiv-Mohyla Academy.

See also 
 Krasnodar Trial — the 1943 war crimes trial in the Russian SSR
 Generalplan Ost
 Russian Research and Educational Holocaust Center
 War crimes of the Wehrmacht

References

Further reading

 
Russia
World War II prisoner of war massacres
Eastern Front (World War II)
Soviet Union in World War II